The Urban Music Association of Canada (UMAC) is a Canadian non-profit organization focused on showcasing and expanding Canadian urban music established in 1996. UMAC offers a variety of service such as workshops, tours and also hosts the Canadian Urban Music Awards. Its president is Trevor Shelton.

History
UMAC was established in 1996 to promote urban music in Canada. It has chosen an Artist of the Year every year since its establishment, a distinction that has been described as "prestigious" by MTV.

Canadian Urban Music Awards
The UMAC created its annual Canadian Urban Music Awards in 1998 "to garner more attention for the country's growing urban-music scene." In 2004, the awards covered 24 categories including soca, gospel, jazz and spoken word. The awards have also been known as Urban X-posure awards.

See also

Canadian hip hop
Music of Canada

References

1996 establishments in Canada
Non-profit organizations based in Toronto
Canadian music awards
Music organizations based in Canada